Nat King Cole Sings for Two In Love is a 1953 album by Nat King Cole, arranged by Nelson Riddle. It was expanded and re-released for the larger 12-inch format in 1955, adding four songs. 

The title may be referred to as Sings for Two In Love.

Track listing 
 "Love Is Here to Stay" (George Gershwin, Ira Gershwin) – 2:49
 "A Handful of Stars" (Jack Lawrence, Ted Shapiro) – 3:26
 "This Can't Be Love" (Lorenz Hart, Richard Rodgers) – 2:30
 "A Little Street Where Old Friends Meet" (Gus Kahn, Harry Woods) – 3:18
 "Autumn Leaves" (Joseph Kosma, Jacques Prévert, Johnny Mercer) – 2:40
 "Let's Fall in Love" (Harold Arlen, Ted Koehler) – 2:48
 "There Goes My Heart" (Benny Davis, Abner Silver) – 2:53
 "Dinner for One, Please James" (Michael Carr)  – 2:57
 "Almost Like Being in Love" (Alan Jay Lerner, Frederick Loewe) – 1:53
 "Tenderly" (Walter Lloyd Gross, Lawrence) – 2:57
 "You Stepped Out of a Dream" (Nacio Herb Brown, Kahn) – 2:35
 "There Will Never Be Another You" (Mack Gordon, Harry Warren) – 3:38

Original 1953 10 inch LP has eight tracks (tracks 5, 6, 11 & 12 not included).

Personnel

Performance 
 Nat King Cole – vocal
 Nelson Riddle – arranger, conductor

References 

1953 albums
Nat King Cole albums
Albums arranged by Nelson Riddle
Capitol Records albums
Albums conducted by Nelson Riddle
Albums produced by Lee Gillette